James Smart may refer to:
 James Smart (architect), (1847–1903), Scottish architect
 James Smart (civil servant) (1888–1957), head of Canadian National Parks Branch, later Parks Canada
 James A. Smart (1858–1942), Canadian merchant and politician in Manitoba
 James S. Smart (1842–1903), American Member of Congress from New York state
 James H. Smart (1841–1900), American educator and president of Purdue University
 James H. Smart (aviator), American winner of the 1931 Ford National Reliability Air Tour
 James Smart (journalist), Kenyan journalist and news anchor
 James Smart (skater), Fen skating champion

See also

 Jamie Smart (born 1978), British comic artist and writer
 Jamie Smart (author), British author and speaker